Megan Abbott (born August 21, 1971) is an American author of crime fiction and of non-fiction analyses of hardboiled crime fiction. Her novels and short stories have drawn from and re-worked classic subgenres of crime writing from a female perspective. She is also an American writer and producer of television.

Biography
Abbott graduated from the University of Michigan. Growing up, Abbott was greatly intrigued by the 1930 and 1940s movies she saw at a movie theater in Grosse Pointe. She believes that watching these films as a child gave her her lifelong interest in crime fiction. She received her Ph.D. in English and American literature from New York University, and has taught at NYU, the State University of New York and the New School University. In 2013-2014, she served as the John Grisham Writer in Residence at the University of Mississippi.

In addition to literature, Abbott has written for major journals and newspapers, including the Los Angeles Times. She also writes a blog with novelist Sara Gran.

Abbott was a screenwriter for The Deuce, an HBO show that premiered in 2017 and deals with pornography and the Mafia in New York in the 1970s and beyond. In 2019, she adapted her bestselling novel Dare Me into a TV series on USA Network. She served as co-showrunner on the series, along with Gina Fattore.

Influences
Abbott was influenced by film noir, classic noir fiction, and Jeffrey Eugenides's novel The Virgin Suicides. Two of her novels make reference to notorious crimes. The Song Is You (2007) is based around the disappearance of Jean Spangler in 1949, and Bury Me Deep (2009) on the 1931 case of Winnie Ruth Judd, dubbed "the Trunk Murderess".

Reception and awards
Abbott has won the Mystery Writers of America's Edgar Award for outstanding fiction. Time named her one of the "23 Authors That We Admire" in 2011. Publishers Weekly gave her 2011 novel The End of Everything a starred review.

Awards

Publications

As editor 
A Hell of a Woman: An Anthology of Female Noir (2007).

Non-fiction 
The Street Was Mine: White Masculinity in Hardboiled fiction and Film Noir (2002).

Novels 
Die a Little (2005). 
The Song Is You (2007). 
Queenpin (2007). 
Bury Me Deep (2009). 
The End of Everything (2011). 
Dare Me (2012). 
The Fever (2014). 
You Will Know Me (2016) ISBN 978-0316231077
Give Me Your Hand (2018). 
The Turnout (Summer 2021) ISBN 978-0593084908

Short stories 
"Oxford Girl" (2016). Appeared in Mississippi Noir.
"Girlie Show" (2016). Appeared in In Sunlight or In Shadow: Stories Inspired by the Paintings of Edward Hopper.
"Little Men" (2015). Appeared in The Best American Mystery Stories 2016.
"My Heart Is Either Broken" (2013). Appeared in Dangerous Women.

Filmography

Television

References

External links
Megan Abbott’s website

Short statement on why she thinks LA is so associated with noir.
Interview

1971 births
Living people
21st-century American novelists
American literary critics
American women literary critics
American women novelists
American crime fiction writers
American mystery novelists
American women screenwriters
21st-century American women writers
Barry Award winners
Edgar Award winners
University of Michigan alumni
Writers from Detroit
Women mystery writers
New York University alumni
Novelists from Michigan
American women non-fiction writers
21st-century American non-fiction writers
American women critics